The SS City of Philadelphia was an iron-hulled single screw passenger steam ship owned by the Liverpool and Philadelphia Steam Ship Company, also known as the "Inman Line."

The third vessel owned by the company, City of Philadelphia was an improvement on the design of SS City of Manchester.

On September 7, 1854, she was wrecked near Cape Race on her maiden voyage, without loss of life.

References 

Steamships of the United Kingdom
1854 ships
Shipwrecks of the Newfoundland and Labrador coast
Maritime incidents in September 1854